The Majthal Sanctuary is situated in Solan District and has steep and rugged terrain. The sanctuary is about 10 km on the kacha road Kararaghat (Shimla-Bilaspur Highway) to Kashlog. The sanctuary is said to have a large population of endangered cheer pheasant, and there is also a large goral population. Recently, a globally threatened bird called the grey-crowned prinia was discovered by Virender Kumar Bhardwaj and Rakeshwar Kapoor. The Himachal Tourism agency recommends winter as a good time to visit the sanctuary.

References

External links
himachaltourism.nic.in
hptdc.gov.in

Wildlife sanctuaries in Himachal Pradesh
Geography of Solan district
Protected areas with year of establishment missing